Quinby Plantation House-Halidon Hill Plantation is a historic plantation house located near Huger, Berkeley County, South Carolina. The house was built about 1800, and is a -story, five bay, frame Federal style plantation house. It sits on a low brick foundation and has a gable roof. In 1954, in order to save Quinby Plantation from destruction, the owners moved it approximately four miles to Halidon Hill Plantation. Halidon Hill Plantation is associated with the lowcountry rice culture and was historically part of Middleburg Plantation.

It was listed in the National Register of Historic Places in 1985.

References

Houses on the National Register of Historic Places in South Carolina
Federal architecture in South Carolina
Houses completed in 1800
Houses in Berkeley County, South Carolina
National Register of Historic Places in Berkeley County, South Carolina
Plantations in South Carolina
Plantation houses in South Carolina
1800 establishments in South Carolina